Beetroot cake is cake that contains beetroots mixed into the batter. Beetroot juice is sometimes used for colouring in red velvet cake.

See also
 Carrot cake

References

Cakes